Burkhimakhi (Dargwa: БурхӀимахьи) is a rural locality (a selo) in Nizhnemulebkinsky Selsoviet, Sergokalinsky District, Republic of Dagestan, Russia. The population was 129 as of 2010. There is 1 street.

Geography 
Burkhimakhi is located 28 km southwest of Sergokala (the district's administrative centre) by road. Bakhmakhi and Ullukimakhi are the nearest rural localities.

Nationalities 
Dargins live there.

References 

Rural localities in Sergokalinsky District